Longnor is a civil parish in Shropshire, England.  It contains 16 listed buildings that are recorded in the National Heritage List for England.  Of these, two are listed at Grade I, the highest of the three grades, two are at Grade II*, the middle grade, and the others are at Grade II, the lowest grade.  The parish contains the village of Longnor and the surrounding countryside.  Most of the listed buildings are houses, cottages and farmhouses, many of which are timber framed and date from the 14th to the 17th century.  The other listed buildings are a church and a country house, both with associated listed structures, and a former mill.


Key

Buildings

References

Citations

Sources

Lists of buildings and structures in Shropshire